First Pacific Company Limited is a Hong Kong-based investment management and holding company with operations located in Asia. It involves telecommunications, consumer food products and infrastructure.

History 

 1981: First Pacific Finance Limited was founded as a financial services provider in Hong Kong. (deposit-taking company or aka finance house). Start-up capital was HK$7 million (US$0.9 million) with a total staff of six (6) in a 500 square feet (50 square meters) office in Central, Hong Kong. Original name was Overseas Union Finance Limited (OUF)
 1982–1987: Acquired Hibernia Bank in San Francisco, a controlling interest in Hagemeyer, the Netherlands, invested in Berli Jucker in Thailand, First Pacific Davies in Hong Kong, United Savings Bank in California, Hong Nin Bank in Hong Kong and founded Metro Pacific Corporation in the Philippines
 1988: First Pacific Holdings and First Pacific International merged to form the currently listed First Pacific Company. (using Shanghai Land of the Kadoorie Family as the listed shell); First investment in telecoms with the purchase of a 50% interest in Pacific Link, Hong Kong. Acquired Dragon Seed Department Store in Hong Kong, set up retail operations (System One for electronic appliances and Sports Authority for sporting goods)
 1989: Acquired a controlling interest in Imagineering Australia thereafter named Tech Pacific
 1992: Acquired Far East Bank and merged with Hong Nin Bank, renamed and listed as First Pacific Bank in Hong Kong
 1988–1996: First Pacific showed significant growth in marketing and distribution, property and banking divisions; and pioneered in regional telecoms investments
 1993–1996: Smart Communications launched cellular services in the Philippines. NTT of Japan invested in Smart Communications as a strategic investor. Acquired PDCP Bank and First e-Bank in the Philippines; Invested in GSM networks in China's Fujian Province, Shenzhen, Dongguan and Huizhou and in Taiwan's Tuntex Telecom, rolled out GSM mobile networks in India through Escotel
 1996: First Pacific became a constituent of the Hang Seng Index
 1998: With the Asian crisis, First Pacific restructured and refocused in Asia with core investments in leading companies in telecoms, consumer food products and infrastructure sectors
 1998–2000: Acquired PLDT in the Philippines and Indofood in Indonesia. Concluded acquisition of Smart Communications by PLDT
 2006: Relisted MPIC as an infrastructure company
 2007: Increased investment in PLDT. Invested in water distribution (Maynilad) and hospital (Makati Medical Center) through MPIC. Listed Indofood's plantations businesses through IndoAgri. IndoAgri acquired Lonsum (plantations)
 2008: First Pacific made its first investments in mining (Philex), and in toll roads (MPTC) through MPIC. MPIC increased investment in Maynilad. Indofood added dairy business through the acquisition of Indolakto
 2009: Invested in electricity distribution (Meralco) through PLDT and MPIC. Increased investment in Philex
 2010: Increased investments in Meralco through Beacon Electric (PLDT and MPIC), in hospitals through MPIC and in Philex. Listed Indofood's consumer branded products businesses through ICBP
 2011: Increased investments in telecoms through PLDT's acquisition of Digitel, in Meralco through Beacon Electric, in hospitals through MPIC. Listed natural resources businesses through Philex Petroleum (oil and gas exploration) and SIMP (plantations)
 2012: Increased investments in Meralco through Beacon Electric (PLDT and MPIC), in Philippine Hydro (PH) Inc. through Maynilad, in CAVITEX through MPTC, in hospital through MPIC, in consumer products through Indofood, in plantations through IndoAgri, SIMP and Lonsum
 2013: FPM Infrastructure (First Pacific and MPIC) acquired 29.45% of Don Muang Tollway; FP Natural Resources (First Pacific and IndoAgri) acquired 34.0% of Roxas Holdings; FPM Power (First Pacific and Meralco) acquired 70.0% of PacificLight Power
 2014: First Pacific sold its 75.0% interest in FPM Infrastructure to MPIC, lifted MPIC stake in Don Muang Tollway to 29.45%
 2015: First Pacific acquired 50.0% of Goodman Fielder; FP Natural Resources (First Pacific and IndoAgri) and its Philippine affiliate increased investment in Roxas Holdings to 50.9%
 2016: Metro Pacific Holdings, Inc. ("MPHI", a Philippine affiliate of First Pacific) sold 4.1% diluted interest in MPIC to GT Capital Holdings, Inc. ("GT Capital") and subscribed newly issued Class A voting preferred shares in MPIC. Post transactions, MPHI holds a voting interest in MPIC of 55.0% and an economic interest of 42.0%; MPIC expanded its power portfolio by increasing its interest in Beacon Electric to 75.0% from 50.0% and invested in Global Business Power Corporation
 2017: MPIC acquired the remaining 25.0% interest in Beacon Electric which became a wholly owned subsidiary of MPIC
 2019: First Pacific sold its 50% interest in Goodman Fielder to Wilmar International Limited; MPIC sold its 40.0% interest in Metro Pacific Hospital Holdings, Inc. to KKR & Co. Inc.
 2020: Indofood CBP acquired the entire issued share capital of Pinehill Company Limited

Businesses
Indonesia:
 Indofood Sukses Makmur Tbk

Philippines:
 Metro Pacific Investments Corporation 
 PLDT 
 Philex Mining Corporation 
 Roxas Holdings Inc.

Malaysia:
 QAF Limited

Singapore:
 PacificLight Power Pte.Ltd

Former businesses
 Tech Pacific (1989–1997) - sold to Hagemeyer
 Pacific Link (1988–1997) - sold to Hong Kong Telecom
 Hibernia Bank (1982–1985) - sold to Security Pacific Bank
 First Pacific Bank (1992–2000) - sold to Bank of East Asia

See also
 Salim Group

References

External links
First Pacific Company Limited

Companies listed on the Hong Kong Stock Exchange
Financial services companies established in 1981
Former companies in the Hang Seng Index
Conglomerate companies of China
Conglomerate companies of Hong Kong